Thurthu Nirgamanais a 2022 Indian Kannada-language romantic drama film directed by Hemanth Kumar. The film stars Suneel Rao, Hitha Chandrashekar, Samyuktha Hegde and Sudharani in lead roles. The music is done by Dheerendra Doss. It  received  positive reviews.

Cast 
Sunil Raoh as Vikram
Sudharani as Nurse
Achyuth Kumar as Jeevan
Raj B. Shetty as Shivu
Hitha Chandrashekar as Mili Sebastian
Samyuktha Hegde as Sindhu
Aruna Balraj as Vikram's Mother
Nagendra Shaan
Amrutha Rammoorthi as Srishti
Rishi as actor Vikram, Cameo appearance
Bhavana Rao as Heroine, cameo appearance

Release
The film was released on 24 June 2022.

References

External links 
 

Indian romantic drama films
2020s Kannada-language films
2022 films
2022 romantic drama films
Films shot in Karnataka
Indian gangster films